Moser's worm problem (also known as mother worm's blanket problem) is an unsolved problem in geometry formulated by the Austrian-Canadian mathematician Leo Moser in 1966. The problem asks for the region of smallest area that can accommodate every plane curve of length 1.  Here "accommodate" means that the curve may be rotated and translated to fit inside the region. In some variations of the problem, the region is restricted to be convex.

Examples
For example, a circular disk of radius 1/2 can accommodate any plane curve of length 1 by placing the midpoint of the curve at the center of the disk.  Another possible solution has the shape of a rhombus with vertex angles of 60 and 120 degrees (/3 and 2/3 radians) and with a long diagonal of unit length. However, these are not optimal solutions; other shapes are known that solve the problem with smaller areas.

Solution properties
It is not completely trivial that a solution exists – an alternative possibility would be that there is some minimal area that can be approached but not actually attained. However, in the convex case, the existence of a solution follows from the Blaschke selection theorem.

It is also not trivial to determine whether a given shape forms a solution.  conjectured that a shape accommodates every unit-length curve if and only if it accommodates every unit-length polygonal chain with three segments, a more easily tested condition, but  showed that no finite bound on the number of segments in a polychain would suffice for this test.

Known bounds
The problem remains open, but over a sequence of papers researchers have tightened the gap between the known lower and upper bounds. In particular,   constructed a (nonconvex) universal cover and showed that the minimum shape has area at most 0.260437;  and  gave weaker upper bounds. In the convex case,  improved an upper bound to 0.270911861.  used a min-max strategy for area of a convex set containing a segment, a triangle and a rectangle to show a lower bound of 0.232239 for a convex cover.

In the 1970s, John Wetzel conjectured that a 30 degree circular sector of unit radius is a cover with area . If confirmed, this will reduce the upper bound for the convex cover by about 3%.

See also
 Moving sofa problem, the problem of finding a maximum-area shape that can be rotated and translated through an L-shaped corridor
 Kakeya set, a set of minimal area that can accommodate every unit-length line segment (with translations allowed, but not rotations)
 Lebesgue's universal covering problem, find the smallest convex area that can cover any planar set of unit diameter
 Bellman's lost in a forest problem, find the shortest path to escape from a forest of known size and shape.

Notes

References
.
.
.
.
.
.
.
.

Discrete geometry
Unsolved problems in geometry
Recreational mathematics